Harris Jacob Bixler (September 16, 1870 – March 29, 1941) was a Republican member of the U.S. House of Representatives from Pennsylvania for three terms from 1921 to 1927.

Early life and career
Harris J. Bixler was born in New Buffalo, Pennsylvania.  He attended Lock Haven State Normal School.  He taught school in the country districts in Perry and Clinton Counties from 1878 to 1892.  He attended Potts Business College in Williamsport, Pennsylvania.

He moved to Johnsonburg, Pennsylvania, in 1892 and worked as a shipping clerk.  He was later was engaged in banking and manufacturing, and served as director of the Johnsonburg National Bank.  He served as president of the city council from 1900 to 1904 and as president of the board of education from 1904 to 1910.  He was mayor of Johnsonburg from 1908 to 1912, and sheriff of Elk County, Pennsylvania, from 1916 to 1920.  He served as chairman of the Republican county committee from 1916 to 1925, and as a treasurer of Elk County from 1920 to 1922.

Congress
Bixler was elected as a Republican to the Sixty-seventh, Sixty-eighth, and Sixty-ninth Congresses.  He was an unsuccessful candidate for renomination in 1926.

Later career and death
He was engaged in business as a freight contractor and also interested in agricultural pursuits.  He died in Johnsonburg.  Interment in Duncannon Cemetery in Duncannon, Pennsylvania.

Sources

The Political Graveyard

1870 births
1941 deaths
Politicians from Williamsport, Pennsylvania
People from Elk County, Pennsylvania
Pennsylvania city council members
Lock Haven University of Pennsylvania alumni
Pennsylvania sheriffs
Mayors of places in Pennsylvania
Schoolteachers from Pennsylvania
Republican Party members of the United States House of Representatives from Pennsylvania
School board members in Pennsylvania